

External links 
 Libraries in Seoul

Libraries
Libraries
Seoul